Sedeh Rural District is a rural district (dehestan) in Sedeh District, Qaen County, South Khorasan Province, Iran. At the 2006 census, its population was 3,569, in 1,250 families.  The rural district has 21 villages.

References 

Rural Districts of South Khorasan Province
Qaen County